is a 1999 fighting game produced by SNK, originally for the Neo Geo system and then as Fatal Fury: Mark of the Wolves for the Dreamcast. It is the eighth (or ninth if one counts Fatal Fury: Wild Ambition) installment of the Fatal Fury series.

Gameplay 

The two-plane system in which characters would fight from two different planes was removed from the game. The game introduces the "Tactical Offense Position" (T.O.P.), which is a special area on the life gauge. When the gauge reaches this area, the character enters the T.O.P. mode, granting the player's character the ability to use a T.O.P. attack, gradual life recovery, and increased attack damage. The game also introduces the "Just Defend" system, which rewards the player who successfully blocks an attack at the last moment with a small amount of health recovery and the ability to immediately counterattack out of block stun. Just Defend was later added as a feature of the K-Groove in Capcom's Capcom vs. SNK 2. Similar to previous titles, the player is given a fighting rank after every round. If the player manages to win all rounds from the Arcade Mode with at least an "AAA" rank, they will face the boss Kain R. Heinlein, which unlocks an ending after he is defeated. If the requirements are not met, then Grant will be the final boss and there will be no special endings. Additionally, through Arcade Mode, before facing Grant, the player will face a mid-boss which can be any character from the cast depending on the character they use.

Plot
Ten years after crime lord Geese Howard's death, the city of Southtown has become more peaceful, leading it to be known as the Second Southtown in reference to having formerly been corrupted by Geese. A new fighting tournament called "King of Fighters: Maximum Mayhem" starts in the area, and several characters related with the fighters from the previous King of Fighters tournaments participate in it.

Fighters

Regular fighters
Rock Howard – Rock is the son of Geese Howard and protégé of Terry Bogard, as well as the new lead character of Garou. His fighting style combines techniques of both Terry and Geese, giving him an edge on both offense and defense. He wears a red and white jacket with a white star on the back, similar to Terry's classic vest.
Terry Bogard – the main hero from the previous Fatal Fury games, and the only returning fighter in Garou. In Garou, Terry has a new look: his long blond ponytail is trimmed, and he has exchanged his trademark red vest, hat, and sneakers for a brown bomber jacket and work boots. Terry has a new Desperation Move, the "Buster Wolf"; however, he no longer uses his original trademark move, the "Rising Tackle", which is instead now used by Rock.
Kevin Rian – Kevin is a high-spirited police officer of Second Southtown. He is also a friend to both Terry and Rock. He fights using Sambo, similar to his distant relative Blue Mary, although much of his fighting style revolves more around direct strikes than grappling. He is cheered on during fights by his friend's son Marky. In Garou, he seeks revenge for the death of his partner, who was murdered by Freeman.
B. Jenet – B. Jenet is an English female pirate who is looking for treasure in Second Southtown. Her fighting style involves wind-like projectiles that hit multiple times, and swooping attacks intended to catch opponents with suddenly changing directions.
Kim Dong-Hwan – Dong-Hwan was taught Taekwondo by his father, Kim Kap-Hwan, using techniques infused with lightning, and has a friendly rivalry with his younger brother Kim Jae-Hoon. He is more of a show-off and slacker than his brother, relying more on aerial attacks and juggles (i.e. attacks that strike the opponent into the air uncontrollably). He believes he is a "genius" in the story, and doesn't need to study diligently in order to master Taekwondo, but his father and brother see it differently.
Kim Jae-Hoon – Jae-Hoon was taught Taekwondo by his father, Kim Kap-Hwan, using techniques infused with fire, and is a brother of Dong Hwan's. Jae-Hoon admires his father, so he fights more like him than Dong-Hwan does, with a combination of high and low attacks with plenty of power behind them. Like his father, he has a strong sense of justice and chivalry, but unlike his brother, he establishes his strength through constant practice.
Gato – Gato is a powerful fighter always in search of stronger opponents. He is the older brother of Hotaru Futaba, but hotly denies this. His actual background and motivations aside from these are unknown.
Hotaru Futaba – Hotaru is the younger sister of Gato. She searches for her brother. She is generally very polite and charming, and is accompanied by her pet sable, Itokatsu. Her stage is a belfry, where a flock of birds removes her cloak.
Hokutomaru – Hokutomaru is a ninja who trained under Andy Bogard. He is extremely fast and crafty (with many moves that are among the fastest in the game), making him a nearly unpredictable opponent to deal with. His stage is a traffic accident that he caused, as he was unfamiliar with urban ways due to his age and training. Hokutomaru carries a sword on his back, but he seldom draws it except during two special moves.
Khushnood Butt – Butt is a Brazilian Kyokugen-style karate expert, who trained under Ryo Sakazaki. He is named Marco Rodriguez in Japan, but was renamed in the U.S. version possibly to avoid confusion with mixed martial artist Ricco Rodriguez. He leads a somewhat austere life in a wooded area on the outskirts of town, and fights using powerful, deliberate attacks. Just like Ryo, he has several famous moves from Art of Fighting with some of his own derivatives.
Tizoc – Tizoc is a famous Mexican pro wrestler in Second Southtown and is seen as a hero in the eyes of children. Somewhat disillusioned, he enters the tournament in order to rekindle his own interest in fighting. His name in the Japanese version of the game is The Griffon Mask.
Freeman – Freeman, real name unknown, is a mysterious English serial killer that fights using slashing movements with his hands as if they were claws. Little is known about him, except that he killed the partner of Kevin Rian. Many of Freeman's special techniques are references to heavy metal bands, such as Nightmare, Morbid Angel, Overkill, and Vision of Disorder.

Bosses/hidden fighters
Grant – Grant, real name Abel Cameron, is a master of the dark style known as Ankoku Karate. He is Kain R. Heinlein's closest friend and personal bodyguard.
Kain R. Heinlein – Kain is the mysterious host of Southtown's "King of Fighters: Maximum Mayhem" tournament. Being the younger brother of Marie Heinlein (Geese Howard's deceased wife and thus Rock Howard's mother), he is Rock's uncle.

Development

Multiple changes to Garou were made to show a bigger difference from previous games due to most characters being new. The character of Rock Howard was created by Nobuyuki Kuroki in 1998. Both he and Yasuyuki Oda wondered what type of hero would succeed Terry Bogard in Fatal Furys latest game, Garou: Mark of the Wolves. While they were not confident with Rock, they still decided to make him as the new protagonist. Rock was designed to contrast previous 'masculine' Fatal Fury characters by giving him a more bishonen appearance, something Nobuyuki Kuroki felt the sequel needed to balance the cast and an issue he felt Real Bout suffered. Similarly, Hotaru was given a moe inspired look to balance the playable characters. Terry was also redesigned, labeled as "cool" by the SNK staff was because they thought Terry's previous look had become outdated. Kengo Asai, who previously worked in Voltage Fighter Gowcaizer, Money Puzzle Exchanger and The Last Blade series, is also involved in development of the game.

SNK director Nobuyuki Kuroki stated in February 2020 that he is personally interested in 'reviving' Garou.

Release
Garou: Mark of the Wolves was originally released for Japanese arcades on November 26, 1999. It was first ported to the Neo Geo on February 25, 2000, and to the Dreamcast on September 21, 2001. The Dreamcast port was re-released on May 23, 2002, under the label of "SNK Best". The original Dreamcast version was the only port released in North America on November 23, 2001, being one of the last games for the system in that region. In such version, it was renamed Fatal Fury: Mark of the Wolves. A PlayStation 2 port of the game was released in Japan on June 30, 2005, but was not released in North America. This port was re-released in the title of "NeoGeo Online Collection" and a "Limited Edition" of the same title on June 30. On June 21, 2007, it was once again released as "SNK Best Collection". The title also came to Xbox Live Arcade on June 24, 2009. The PlayStation 4 and PlayStation Vita ports were later released, the latter for PlayStation Network in December 2016. A Nintendo Switch port would be released by Hamster Corporation on May 11, 2017, digitally under the ACA Neo Geo label marking the first time the game is available for Nintendo players. The Xbox One wouldn't receive its own port of Garou until August 16, 2018, under the ACA Neo Geo banner. This version - a straight, barebones port of the original arcade game - was also released for the PlayStation 4 on the same day, separate from the online-capable version that had already been released for the console more than two years prior. In 2020, GOG, Steam, PlayStation 4, and PlayStation Vita versions of Garou featured rollback netcode from an update by Code Mystics, who also added their port of the game which replaced DotEmu’s port that was released on Steam.

Planned sequel
During the fan event 2005 KOF-party, illustrator Falcoon mentioned that the game's sequel was around seventy percent complete for the Neo Geo by the SNK team. Falcoon also confirmed that one of the new characters meant to appear was a student from Joe Higashi, a character who starred in all of the Fatal Fury games. In July 2006 SNK reported that they were still working on the sequel, saying that they will use modern high-resolution graphics instead of the resolution quality level seen in the original game. During an interview in March 2008, SNK USA developers commented that there was not any concrete schedule of demands for the game and that they plan to make the sequel with some new technology. In June 2016, SNK revealed the cast of the Garou: Mark of the Wolvess sequel.

During EVO 2022, it was revealed that a sequel was officially greenlit to be in development at SNK.

Reception

In Japan, Game Machine listed Garou: Mark of the Wolves on their January 1, 2000 issue as being the most-successful arcade game of the month. GameSpot named Mark of the Wolves the best fighting game of 2001. It was nominated for the publication's annual "Best Game No One Played" and "Best Dreamcast Game" prizes among console games, but lost these respectively to Victorious Boxers: Ippo's Road to Glory and Phantasy Star Online. It was also nominated for "Outstanding Fighting Game Sequel" by the National Academy of Video Game Trade Reviewers, but lost to Dead or Alive 3.

Notes

References

External links 
 
 Garou: Mark of the Wolves at GameFAQs
 Garou: Mark of the Wolves at Giant Bomb
 Garou: Mark of the Wolves at Killer List of Videogames
 Garou: Mark of the Wolves at MobyGames

ACA Neo Geo games
1999 video games
Android (operating system) games
Arcade video games
Dreamcast games
Fatal Fury
Fighting games used at the Super Battle Opera tournament
Multiplayer and single-player video games
IOS games
Neo Geo games
Nintendo Switch games
PlayStation 2 games
PlayStation Network games
PlayStation Vita games
PlayStation 4 games
SNK games
SNK Playmore games
Fighting games
Video games with cross-platform play
Xbox 360 Live Arcade games
Xbox One games
Video games developed in Japan
Hamster Corporation games
Code Mystics games
Agetec games